Valeriy Boychenko (born 26 February 1989) is a Ukrainian former  professional football midfielder who played for Kharkiv in the Ukrainian Premier League. He was promoted from the reserve squad in July 2008.

External links
Official Website Profile

1989 births
Living people
Ukrainian footballers
FC Kharkiv players

Association football midfielders